Catherine Victoria Aitken (née Lockwood;  born 20 April 1965), formerly Victoria, Countess Spencer, is a British former fashion model and former wife of Charles Spencer, 9th Earl Spencer, the younger brother of Diana, Princess of Wales.

Marriages and family
Catherine Victoria Lockwood is the daughter of John Lockwood, an airline executive, and Jean Lockwood,  Holt.

On 16 September 1989, she married Charles Spencer, then Viscount Althorp, at the Church of St Mary, Great Brington. Her wedding dress of champagne French antique lace with Russian sable trim was designed by Tomasz Starzewski, and she wore the Spencer Tiara. Althorp's nephews Prince Harry and Alexander Fellowes were the pageboys at their wedding and his nieces Eleanor Fellowes and Emily McCorquodale were bridesmaids. During her first marriage, she was known as Viscountess Althorp, and later as Countess Spencer. They have four children:
 
Lady Kitty Eleanor Spencer (born 28 December 1990)
Lady Eliza Victoria Spencer (born 10 July 1992)
Lady Katya Amelia Spencer (born 10 July 1992)
Louis Frederick John Spencer, Viscount Althorp (born 14 March 1994); heir apparent to the earldom.

She suffered from eating disorders and drug and alcohol abuse during her first marriage. It was alleged that the earl had an extra-marital affair with a journalist early in the marriage.  The couple moved with their four children to South Africa in 1995 to avoid the media. After their divorce on 3 December 1997, Lord Spencer moved back to the United Kingdom, and subsequently remarried.

In 2005, Victoria, Countess Spencer married South African businessman Jonathan Aitken; they divorced in 2009. They have a son, Samuel Aitken (born 18 April 2003).

She is the sister of Christopher Lockwood, a journalist and later Deputy Head of the Number 10 Policy Unit from May 2013 to May 2015.

References

1965 births
Victoria

Spencer
British female models
Living people
British expatriates in South Africa